Pagari is a village in Alutaguse Parish, Ida-Viru County in northeastern Estonia.

References

 

Villages in Ida-Viru County